Terry Rodney Murray (born July 20, 1950) is a Canadian former professional ice hockey player and the former head coach of the Washington Capitals, Philadelphia Flyers, Florida Panthers and Los Angeles Kings. He is now retired from professional hockey.

Playing career
Murray was born in Shawville, Quebec. A defenceman in his playing days, Murray was drafted by the California Golden Seals in the 1970 NHL Entry Draft. He played for the Philadelphia Flyers, Detroit Red Wings, and Washington Capitals.

Coaching career
Following his final season as an active player in 1981–82, he became an assistant coach for his brother Bryan Murray, then the Capitals' head coach, establishing the NHL's first brother coaching combination.

Murray later served as head coach of their AHL affiliate, the Baltimore Skipjacks. He was promoted to the Capitals head coach position in the middle of the 1989–90 NHL season, replacing his brother Bryan. Under Murray's guidance, the Capitals advanced further into the NHL playoffs than ever before, winning two rounds before being swept by Boston in the conference finals.  Murray coached the Capitals until the middle of the 1993–94 NHL season when he was replaced by Jim Schoenfeld.

After a brief coaching stint as head coach of the Cincinnati Cyclones in the IHL, Murray became head coach of the Philadelphia Flyers, where he put together the "Legion of Doom" line consisting of Eric Lindros, John LeClair, and Mikael Renberg. In three seasons as head coach of the Flyers (1994–95 through 1996–97), Murray compiled a 118–64–30 record and coached the team to two Atlantic Division Championships (1994–95 and 1995–96) and to the 1997 Stanley Cup Finals as the Eastern Conference Champion. After beating three teams easily with 4-1 series wins, the Flyers were swept by the Detroit Red Wings in four games. Despite this accomplishment, Murray was fired after the end of the 1997 playoffs. One website had described Terry's shuffling of goaltenders Ron Hextall and Garth Snow to be unprofessional, while others felt it was a possible panic move, and even Snow was caught by surprise at the move after the Game 1 loss to have him in for Hextall. 

When the Flyers lost 6-1 in Game 3, he described the result as a choking situation during a closed-door meeting with his players, which angered them since it "exposed and pulverized" the "fragility of the team's confidence". Murray served as a pro scout for the Flyers during the 1997–98 season, which saw Wayne Cashman named as coach, who was meant to be a more communicative coach.

During the 1998–99 season, Murray assumed the Panthers' head coaching position from his brother, Bryan, the interim Panthers' coach, after Doug MacLean was fired.  In 1999–2000, Murray led the Panthers to a franchise record 98-point season, team-record 43 victories, and into the first round of the playoffs.  He was replaced by Duane Sutter at the Panthers' helm in the fall of 2000.

Murray served as a pro scout for the Philadelphia Flyers over parts of three seasons (2000–01 to 2002–03) and joined the coaching staff as an assistant coach from 2003 to 2008.

He served as coach of the Los Angeles Kings from July 17, 2008, until December 12, 2011. At the time of his dismissal, he ranked third in franchise wins (139), fourth in games coached (275), and first in winning percentage (.560). Assistant coach John Stevens was named interim head coach. When the Kings won the 2012 Stanley Cup Finals under then-head coach Darryl Sutter, they requested the NHL to have Murray's name included on the cup but were denied by the NHL.

Murray then served as head coach of the Lehigh Valley Phantoms of the American Hockey League. At the time, Murray was the only coach in the AHL who had coached in the league in the 1980s.
He was later named as an assistant coach for the Buffalo Sabres on June 18, 2015. He returned to the Phantoms as an assistant coach in December 2018.

Personal life
Terry and his wife, Linda, reside in Scarborough, Maine. They have two daughters, Meaghan and Lindsey.

Murray, one of ten children of Clarence and Rhoda Murray, was born and raised in the Ottawa Valley town of Shawville, Quebec, near Ottawa.

Career statistics

Regular season and playoffs

NHL coaching record

References

External links
 
Profile at hockeydraftcentral.com

1950 births
Living people
Anglophone Quebec people
Baltimore Clippers players
Baltimore Skipjacks coaches
Boston Braves (AHL) players
Buffalo Sabres coaches
California Golden Seals draft picks
Canadian expatriate ice hockey players in the United States
Canadian ice hockey defencemen
Canadian ice hockey coaches
California Golden Seals players
Detroit Red Wings players
Florida Panthers coaches
Ice hockey people from Quebec
Los Angeles Kings coaches
Maine Mariners players
National Hockey League assistant coaches
Ottawa 67's players
People from Outaouais
Philadelphia Flyers coaches
Philadelphia Flyers players
Philadelphia Flyers scouts
Providence Reds players
Richmond Robins players
Salt Lake Golden Eagles (CHL) players
Salt Lake Golden Eagles (WHL) players
Washington Capitals coaches
Washington Capitals players